Kevin Jeffrey Clash (born September 17, 1960) is an American puppeteer, director and producer known for puppeteering Elmo on Sesame Street from 1984 to 2012. He also performed puppets for Labyrinth, Dinosaurs, Oobi, and various Muppet productions.

Clash developed an interest in puppetry at an early age and, in his teen years, performed for local television children's shows in his hometown of Baltimore, Maryland. He joined the cast of Captain Kangaroo in the early 1980s and began performing on Sesame Street in 1984. He was the fifth puppeteer to perform Elmo, who became his signature character, and he also served as an executive producer and director for the show. Clash worked in various productions with The Jim Henson Company and occasionally on other projects. Clash's autobiography, My Life as a Furry Red Monster, was published in 2006; he was later the subject of the documentary Being Elmo: A Puppeteer's Journey (2011).

Clash resigned from Sesame Street in 2012 after allegations of sexual impropriety, all of which he denied and were later dismissed due to expiration of the statute of limitations. Clash returned to puppeteering as a supporting performer in the adult comedy The Happytime Murders (2018).

Early years
Clash was born in Baltimore, Maryland, on September 17, 1960, the third of four children born to George Clash, a flash welder and handyman, and Gladys Clash, who ran a small daycare center in their two-bedroom, one-bath home in the Turner Station area of Dundalk, Maryland.  Clash developed an interest in puppetry at an early age, inspired by children's shows like Kukla, Fran and Ollie and Sesame Street.  He made his first puppet, a version of Mickey Mouse, at the age of 10.  When he was twelve, he made a monkey puppet out of the lining of his father's coat.  His first performances were for his mother's daycare children.

By the time he was a teenager, he had built almost 90 puppets, which he based upon commercials, popular music, and his friends.  While still in high school, Clash performed at venues throughout Baltimore, including schools, churches, fundraisers, and community events.  While appearing at a neighborhood festival, Clash was discovered by Baltimore television personality Stu Kerr, who became Clash's first mentor and hired him to perform in the children's show Caboose at Channel 2.  Clash also built puppets for the Romper Room franchise.  When he was 17, he contacted and met puppeteer Kermit Love, who became Clash's mentor, after seeing Love featured in an episode of the children's educational television series Call It Macaroni. In 1979, on Love's recommendation, Clash appeared as Cookie Monster in the Sesame Street float during the Macy's Thanksgiving Day Parade and met Jim Henson, who later became his boss, mentor, and good friend.

When he was 19, Clash became a puppeteer for Captain Kangaroo, initially as a guest performer, in which he also made occasional on-camera appearances.  The producers of Captain Kangaroo used some of Clash's puppet creations for the show.  In 1984, Clash had to turn down Henson's offer to work on his film The Dark Crystal because he was working on two TV shows at the same time, Captain Kangaroo and Love's syndicated program The Great Space Coaster, in which he was producer for the first time.

Career
Captain Kangaroo was canceled in 1984 after 29 seasons, and Great Space Coaster ended, freeing up Clash to work on projects with Henson such as the film Labyrinth and Sesame Street. Clash started working at Sesame Street for ten episodes in 1983, mostly performing nondescript, stand-in puppets known as Anything Muppets.  Some of his earliest characters included the saxophone-playing Hoots the Owl (based on Louis Armstrong), the infant Baby Natasha, and inventor Dr. Nobel Price. After 1985, Elmo, a furry red monster, became his main character. Three puppeteers, including Richard Hunt, had performed Elmo previously, but it was Clash's development, with a falsetto voice, that established the character. He based Elmo's character on the preschool children that attended his mother's daycare in Baltimore and upon his own personality and the personality of his parents.  Clash followed the advice of fellow puppeteer Frank Oz, who told Clash to always "find one special hook" for each character. Clash decided that the central characteristic for Elmo should be that he "should represent love".

After the height of Elmo's popularity, especially the "Tickle Me Elmo" craze in 1996, Clash's responsibilities at Sesame Street increased. He recruited, auditioned, and trained its puppeteers, and became the senior Muppet coordinator, a writer, director, and co-producer of the "Elmo's World" segment of the show.  Clash worked with and mentored the puppeteers of Sesame Street's international co-productions.  He found working with the co-productions "a lot of fun" and "very rewarding".  He worked on the 1985 feature film Follow That Bird. In 2007, he was promoted to senior creative adviser for the Sesame Workshop.  Until 2011, he was the sole performer as Elmo in all his public relations appearances, making his schedule, as he called it, "crazy".  Cheryl Henson, president of the Jim Henson Foundation, called him "essential" to the show.

Clash worked on the first film version of Teenage Mutant Ninja Turtles, in 1990 and the sequel, Teenage Mutant Ninja Turtles II: The Secret of the Ooze, which was dedicated to Henson, in 1991, voicing Master Splinter.  He performed in several productions with Jim Henson Productions, including as the Muppet Clifford in The Jim Henson Hour (1989), and performing the puppetry for Frank Oz's characters (Miss Piggy, Fozzie Bear, Sam the Eagle, and Animal) in Muppet Treasure Island (1996). Clash performed in the films Muppets from Space (1999) and The Muppets' Wizard of Oz (2005), and the TV series Muppets Tonight (1996—1998), in which he reprised Clifford, who served as the show's host. He performed characters and worked behind the scenes on the sitcom Dinosaurs.

In 2006, Clash published his autobiography, co-written by Gary Brozek and Louis Henry Mitchell, entitled My Life as a Furry Red Monster: What Being Elmo Has Taught Me About Life, Love and Laughing Out Loud.  His life was featured in the 2011 documentary Being Elmo: A Puppeteer's Journey.

After a hiatus of several years, Clash returned to performing with the film The Happytime Murders (2018), directed by Brian Henson and co-produced through Henson Alternative. He later puppeteered in the 2019 Netflix series The Dark Crystal: Age of Resistance, which serves as a prequel series to the 1982 Jim Henson film The Dark Crystal.

Personal life
Clash has stated that although children ignore him and speak directly to Elmo, black adults tend to be surprised when they meet him. He has stated in interviews that his racial identity was pertinent to his work, and that it came through in his performances.

Clash was married for 17 years and has a daughter who was born in 1993.

In November 2012, Clash publicly revealed his homosexuality in response to the allegations that led to his resignation from Sesame Workshop, stating, "I am a gay man. I have never been ashamed of this or tried to hide it, but felt it was a personal and private matter."

In 2015, Clash moved to Los Angeles to work on other Jim Henson Company productions, including The Happytime Murders and The Dark Crystal: Age of Resistance, performing Lyle and Mr. Bumblypants in the former and Aughra in the latter.

Abuse allegations
In November 2012, 23-year-old Sheldon Stephens alleged that he had been in a sexual relationship with Clash that began when Stephens was 16 - which would be a felony under New York law.  Sesame Workshop had initially been presented with the allegation in June, and its investigation found the allegation to be unsubstantiated. Clash acknowledged that he had been in a relationship with the accuser; however, he said the relationship was between two consenting adults. Stephens later recanted his accusation, but two weeks later, another accuser, Cecil Singleton, accused Clash of sexually abusing him when he was 15 years old, and lawsuits were filed by attorney Jeffrey Herman against Clash.

Clash resigned from Sesame Workshop on November 20, 2012, and released a statement saying, "Personal matters have diverted attention away from the important work 'Sesame Street' is doing and I cannot allow it to go on any longer. I am deeply sorry to be leaving and am looking forward to resolving these personal matters privately".  Sesame Workshop also released a statement: "Unfortunately, the controversy surrounding Kevin's personal life has become a distraction that none of us want, and he has concluded that he can no longer be effective in his job and has resigned from 'Sesame Street'."  They stated that other puppeteers had been trained to serve as Clash's understudy and would take over his roles on the show.

In July 2013, the three cases against Clash were dismissed because it was ruled that the claims were made more than six years after each man reasonably should have become aware of Clash's alleged violations during the three years after each turned 18. Clash's lawyers expressed his hope that the ruling would allow him to restore his personal and professional life.  Lawyers for the plaintiffs appealed the ruling, alleging that the psychological effects of the abuse were not fully realized until 2012.  In April 2014, the decision to dismiss the three lawsuits was upheld by the U.S. Court of Appeals. Months after the other alleged victims made legal accusations, Stephens filed a lawsuit in Pennsylvania against Clash, but it was ultimately dismissed in June 2014 because the statute of limitations had passed.

Filmography

Awards and honors
 Clash won Daytime Emmy Awards for Outstanding Performer in a Children's Series for his work as Elmo on Sesame Street in 1990, 2005–2007, and 2009–2013.  In all, he has won 27 daytime Emmys and one prime-time Emmy.
 He was the first recipient of the 'Miss Jean' Worthley Award for Service to Families and Children given by Maryland Public Television on June 9, 2007.
 On May 19, 2012, Clash was presented with an honorary degree from Washington & Jefferson College.

Notes

References

Works cited
 Clash, Kevin, Gary Brozek, and Louis Henry Mitchell (2006). My Life as a Furry Red Monster: What Being Elmo has Taught Me About Life, Love and Laughing Out Loud. New York: Random House. 
 Davis, Michael (2008). Street Gang: The Complete History of Sesame Street. New York: Viking Penguin. 
 Herman, Karen  (2004-07-20).  Archive of American Television.  Parts 1–4.
 Marks, Constance (Director) (2011) (DVD). Being Elmo: A Puppeteer's Journey.

External links
 
 
 Being Elmo homepage

1960 births
Living people
20th-century American male actors
20th-century American LGBT people
21st-century American male actors
21st-century American LGBT people
African-American male actors
African-American media personalities
American gay actors
American gay writers
American male film actors
American puppeteers
Daytime Emmy Award winners
LGBT African Americans
LGBT people from Maryland
Male actors from Baltimore
Muppet performers
People from Dundalk, Maryland
Sesame Street Muppeteers